Anthidium gussakovskiji is a species of bee in the family Megachilidae, the leaf-cutter, carder, or mason bees.

Synonyms
Synonyms for this species include:
Anthidium neosyriacum Mavromoustakis, 1956
Anthidium (Anthidium) gussakovskiji neosyriacum Mavromoustakis, 1956

References

gussakovskiji
Insects described in 1939